The Guns of Navarone or Navarone may refer to:

The Guns of Navarone (novel), 1957 World War II-set novel by Alistair MacLean
Navarone Island, fictional Greek isle in MacLean's novel
The Guns of Navarone (film), 1961 film based on MacLean's novel
The Guns of Navarone (song), film's theme song, covered by Jamaican ska group The Skatalites in 1965 and later covered by The Specials 
"Guns of Navarone" (Sean Paul song), 2021 song by Sean Paul from his album Live N Livin! featuring Jesse Royal, Stonebwoy & Mutabaruka 
Force 10 From Navarone, 1968 novel by Alistair MacLean, sequel to The Guns of Navarone
Force 10 from Navarone (film), released in 1978 and loosely based on MacLean's 1968 novel
Navarone (video game), Japanese arcade video game released by Namco in 1980, loosely inspired by 1961 and 1978 films
Navarone (band), Dutch rock band formed in 2008

See also
Navarrone, American historical novel by Helen R. Myers; winner of 1993 RITA Award#Contemporary Romance